Emy Coligado (born June 5, 1971, in Geneva, Ohio) is an American actress known for her role as Piama Tananahaakna on the sitcom Malcolm in the Middle. In 2001, Coligado landed a recurring role as Emmy, the medical examiner's assistant, on the drama Crossing Jordan. Coligado also appears on NBC's web series CTRL as well as Poppy Tang in NBC's Chuck. She also played Ling in The Three Stooges.  Most recently, Coligado played the role of Helen Yung in Archive 81.

Filmography

Film

Television

External links

1971 births
20th-century American actresses
21st-century American actresses
Actresses from Ohio
American film actresses
American people of Filipino descent
American television actresses
Living people
People from Geneva, Ohio
Texas Christian University alumni